Walter Haas may refer to:

 Walter A. Haas (1889–1979), president and chairman of Levi Strauss & Co.
 Walter A. Haas Jr. (1916–1995), president and chairman of Levi Strauss & Co., son of Walter A. Haas.
 Walter de Haas or Hanns Günther (1886–1969), German author, translator and editor
 Walter H. Haas (1917–2015), founder of Association of Lunar and Planetary Observers
 Walter F. Haas (1869–1936), city attorney of Los Angeles, California
 Walter J. Haas, American businessman and former president of the Oakland Athletics